Clinical Radiology is a medical journal that covers the aspects of clinical radiology, including: computed tomography, magnetic resonance imaging, ultrasonography etc. The journal is published by Elsevier.

Abstracting and indexing 
The journal is abstracted and indexed in:

 Scopus
 Biological Abstracts
 Chemical Abstracts
 Elsevier BIOBASE
 Current Contents - Clinical Medicine
 Embase
 Nuclear Science Abstracts
 Research Alert
 Science Citation Index
 Social Sciences Citation Index
 CINAHL
 Sociedad Iberoamericana de Informacion Cientifica (SIIC) Data Bases
 PubMed/Medline

According to the Journal Citation Reports, the journal has a 2021 impact factor of 3.389.

References

External links 

 

Elsevier academic journals
English-language journals
Radiology and medical imaging journals
ISSN needed
Publications with year of establishment missing